The 1978 Iowa Hawkeyes football team represented the University of Iowa in the 1978 Big Ten Conference football season. This was Bob Commings' fifth and final season as the head coach of the Hawkeyes.

Schedule

Roster

Game summaries

Northwestern

Iowa State

at Arizona

Utah

at Minnesota

at Ohio State

Purdue

Michigan

at Indiana

Wisconsin

at Michigan State

Team players in the 1979 NFL Draft

References

Iowa
Iowa Hawkeyes football seasons
Iowa Hawkeyes football